Farre or Farré is a surname, and may refer to:

Antonio Farré (b. 1961), Spanish actor, voice-over artist, and television host
Arthur Farre (1811–1887), English obstetric physician
Frederic John Farre (1804–1886), English physician
Guillermo Farré (b. 1981), Argentine footballer
Jean-Joseph Farre (1816–1887), French general and statesman
John Richard Farre (1775–1862), English physician
Juan Avilés Farré (b. 1950), Spanish historian and professor
Mariella Farré (b. 1963), Swiss singer
Norma Pujol i Farré (b. 1988), Catalan teacher and politician
Rowena Farre (1921–1979), British writer 
William Farre (1874–1950), Norwegian musician, conductor, and composer

See also
Farres
Sònia Farré Fidalgo
Miguel Farré Mallofré
Josep Maria Farré Naudi
Joan Albert Farré Santuré

Catalan-language surnames